Patrick Baum  (born 23 June 1987 in Worms, Germany) is a male table tennis player from Germany. He won the singles title at the 2005 World Junior Table Tennis Championships. Since 2008, he has won several medals in singles and team events in the World Table Tennis Championships, in the Table Tennis World Cup, and in the Table Tennis European Championships. In 2013, he defeated Dimitrij Ovtcharov in the round of 16 in the 2013 World Table Tennis Championships but was defeated by eventual champion Zhang Jike in the quarterfinals 4–1.

See also
 List of table tennis players

References

1987 births
Living people
German male table tennis players
Table tennis players at the 2015 European Games
European Games competitors for Germany
People from Worms, Germany
Sportspeople from Rhineland-Palatinate